The following species  are recognised in the genus Antirrhinum:

Antirrhinum australe 
Antirrhinum × bilbilitanum 
Antirrhinum braun-blanquetii 
Antirrhinum charidemi 
Antirrhinum × chavannesii 
Antirrhinum cirrhigerum 
Antirrhinum controversum 
Antirrhinum graniticum 
Antirrhinum grosii 
Antirrhinum hispanicum 
Antirrhinum × inexpectans 
Antirrhinum × kretschmeri 
Antirrhinum latifolium 
Antirrhinum majus 
Antirrhinum martenii 
Antirrhinum meonanthum 
Antirrhinum microphyllum 
Antirrhinum molle 
Antirrhinum × montserratii 
Antirrhinum pertegasii 
Antirrhinum pulverulentum 
Antirrhinum rothmaleri 
Antirrhinum sempervirens 
Antirrhinum siculum 
Antirrhinum tortuosum 
Antirrhinum valentinum

References 

Antirrhinum